Shapiro v. Thompson, 394 U.S. 618 (1969), was a landmark decision of the Supreme Court of the United States that invalidated state durational residency requirements for public assistance and helped establish a fundamental "right to travel" in U.S. law.  Although the Constitution does not explicitly mention the right to travel, it is implied by the other rights given in the Constitution.

Facts of the case
The Connecticut Welfare Department invoked Connecticut law denying an application for Aid to Families with Dependent Children assistance to appellee Vivian Marie Thompson, a 19-year-old unwed mother of one child and pregnant with her second child, because she had changed her residence in June 1966 from the Dorchester neighborhood of Boston, Massachusetts, to Hartford, Connecticut, to live with her mother. When her mother was no longer able to support her, she and her infant son moved  to her own apartment in Hartford in August 1966. Thompson could not work or enter a work training program. Her application for assistance, filed in August 1966, was denied in November solely on the ground that she had not lived in the State for a year before her application was filed, a requirement under Connecticut law.

Case history
Thompson brought suit in the United States District Court for the District of Connecticut where a three-judge panel, one judge dissenting, declared the provision of Connecticut law unconstitutional, holding that the waiting-period requirement is unconstitutional because it "has a chilling effect on the right to travel" and also holding that the provision violated the Equal Protection Clause of the Fourteenth Amendment, "because the denial of relief to those resident in the State for less than a year is not based on any permissible purpose but is solely designed, as 'Connecticut states quite frankly,' 'to protect its fisc by discouraging entry of those who come needing relief'" (decision of the Court).

This case examined laws that required a period of residence in a jurisdiction before welfare benefits would become available to a new resident.  The state asserted that its interest in requiring this waiting period was to deter needy citizens from other states from coming to the state for the sole purpose of receiving superior welfare benefits.  The Court held that the purpose of inhibiting the migration of needy people was a constitutionally impermissible objective.  The state also argued that this requirement was an attempt to apportion services based on how much residence has contributed (i.e. longer residence means more taxes paid) but such apportionment is not allowed under the Equal protection clause.

The state asserted that the requirement served the states interest in efficient administration of welfare by providing an objective test of residence, allowing for planning a budget, minimizing fraud, and encouragement entry into the workforce before seeking welfare.

Decision of the Court
Because the constitutional right to free movement between states was implicated, the Court applied a standard of strict scrutiny and held none of these interests were sufficient to sustain the waiting requirement.  The Court held that there was no evidence that the requirement would make planning a budget more predictable, and that if a waiting period encouraged  new residents to enter the workforce it should also be applied to current residents, and that the interest in deterring fraud and having an objective verification of residence could be better served by less restrictive means (e.g. calling welfare recipients periodically).

Finally the Court rejected the argument that Congress had authorized the waiting period because Congress does not have the power to authorize violations of the equal protection clause.

The Court reaffirmed the right to travel under the 14th Amendment's Privileges and Immunities clause in Saenz v. Roe (1999).

Dissenting opinions
Chief Justice Warren, joined by Justice Black, dissented.  Congress has the power to authorize these restrictions under the commerce clause.  Under the commerce clause, Congress needs only a rational basis to a legitimate state interest, not a necessary relation to a compelling interest.

Justice Harlan also dissented, arguing that the requirement of a compelling interest and necessary relationship between the law and that interest serve as an example of intermediate scrutiny.

See also
List of United States Supreme Court cases, volume 394
 Saenz v. Roe (1999)

References

External links
 
 

United States Supreme Court cases
United States Supreme Court cases of the Warren Court
1969 in United States case law
United States equal protection case law